Sir James Milne Wilson,   (29 February 1812 – 29 February 1880) served as Premier of Tasmania from 1869 to 1872.

Biography
Wilson was born in 1812 in Banff, Scotland; the third son of John Wilson, a shipowner, and his wife, Barbara Gray; maternal grandson of Alexander Gray and wife, Jean Bean (See Pedigree of Bean of Portsoy). Educated at Banff and Edinburgh, he emigrated to Tasmania in 1829, studied practical engineering and afterwards became a ship's officer. He was connected with the Cascade Brewery for 14 years and became its manager. He entered politics in October 1859 as member for Hobart in the legislative council, and in January 1863 joined the Whyte cabinet as minister without portfolio. In 1868, at the time of the visit of the Duke of Edinburgh, Wilson was Mayor of Hobart and on 4 August 1869 became Premier and colonial secretary in a ministry which lasted until November 1872.

Anthony Trollope, who came to Australia in 1871, formed a high opinion of Wilson: "I thought I had not met a sounder politician in Australia... Victoria is desirous of annexing Tasmania. Perhaps when she has done so, Mr Wilson will become premier for the joint colonies, and then great things may be expected." In 1872, Wilson was elected President of the Tasmanian Legislative Council, and held this position until his death on 29 February 1880, on his "seventeenth" birthday aged 68.

In 1847, he married Deborah Hope, daughter of Peter Degraves. Lady Wilson survived him with children. He was knighted in 1873 and created K.C.M.G. in 1878. He was a man of unbounded popularity, well known for his charities. He was president of the Southern Tasmanian Agricultural Society and chairman of committees and president of the Tasmanian Jockey Club. As a politician Wilson showed wisdom in his advocacy of free-trade between the Australian colonies. Tasmania passed an intercolonial free trade act in 1870 during his premiership, but the question made no headway on the mainland.

In an extremely rare coincidence, he was born on 29 February (making him a leapling) and died on the same date at the age of 68.

References

1812 births
1880 deaths
Premiers of Tasmania
People from Banff, Aberdeenshire
Australian people of Scottish descent
Knights Commander of the Order of St Michael and St George
Presidents of the Tasmanian Legislative Council
Mayors and Lord Mayors of Hobart
Scottish emigrants to colonial Australia
19th-century Australian politicians